Deoria, Uttar Pradesh may refer to:

Deoria, Uttar Pradesh, one of five tehsils of Deoria district
Deoria district
Deoria Sadar railway station
Deoria (Assembly constituency)
Deoria (Lok Sabha constituency)

See also
 Deori (disambiguation)
 Devaria (disambiguation)